The Xinguang Bridge is an arch bridge located in Guangzhou, Guangdong, China. Opened in 2008, it has a main span of  making it one of the ten longest arch bridge spans in the world.

See also 
List of longest arch bridge spans

References

External links
 

Suspension bridges in China
Bridges in Guangzhou
Bridges over the Pearl River (China)
Bridges completed in 2008